The Caribbean least gecko (Sphaerodactylus homolepis) is a species of lizard in the family Sphaerodactylidae. It is endemic to Nicaragua, Costa Rica, and Panama.

References

Sphaerodactylus
Reptiles described in 1886